The Nevada Journal was a Nevada City, California newspaper. It was the first paper published in Nevada County, and was also one of the first ever published in the mountains of the U.S. state of California. Controlled by the Whigs, the first issue was published on April 19 (or 21), 1851 by Warren Baxter Ewer. During its first ten years, the editors were W.B. Ewer (1851); Henry ("Harry") A. DeCourcey and Aaron A. Sargent (1852–55); E.G. Waite (1855–56) A.A. Sargent (1856); E.G. Waite (1858); B. Bireley (1859–1861). After Ewer, the publishers were Alban & DeCourcey with A.A. Sargent (1852); Sargent & Budd, E.R. Budd (1854); N.P. Brown & Co. (1855); Waite, Brown, Skelton & Fuller Co. (1855–56); Brown, Waite & Co. (1856); Brown & Waite (1856–1858); Lockwood, Thompson & Waite (1858); Brown, Waite & Co. (1859–1861). It suspended publication in 1861, but was revived soon after and published another year and a half.

References

1851 establishments in California
Defunct newspapers published in California
History of Nevada City, California